The Army of the Rhine was a French military unit that fought in the Franco-Prussian War. It was created after the declaration of war on July 18 1870.

The unit participated in combats in Lorraine, then divided to form a second army, the Army of Châlons.

The Army of the Rhine surrendered on 27 October at the Siege of Metz.

Creation of the unit 
The Army of the Rhine was the first French Army constituted after the declaration of war, formed from the available troops during peacetime. Initially commanded by the Emperor Napoleon III, the Army included the Imperial Guard, 7 Army Corps and a general reserve. Each Army Corps was constituted of 3 or 4 infantry division and 1 cavalry division made up of 2 or 3 brigades each, one artillery reserve and one engineer reserve. Each brigade counted 2 or 3 line infantry or line cavalry regiments.

The infantry divisions included an artillery component with 2 batteries de canons de 4 and 1 de mitrailleuse, while the cavalry divisions constituted 2 batteries horse mounted.

Formation of the army corps:

 The Imperial Guard of the Second Empire, with commander, général Bourbaki, garrisoned in Paris in times of peace. The Imperial Guard reached Metz on July 28 and the Guard reserves on the 30.
 The 1st Army Corps, commanded by Maréchal de France Patrice de Mac Mahon, Duc de Magenta was formed in principal by troops from Algeria and the regiments of Eastern France. This Army Corps activated on August 1, 1870. Its initial role was to cover the Alsace.
 The 2nd Army Corps was consisted of troops of the Camp de Châlons, commanded by Frossard, aide de camp of the Emperor. These units made their way to Saint-Avold and Forbach.
 The 3rd Army Corps was formed by troops from Paris, Metz and Nancy. Commanded by Marshal François Achille Bazaine until August 12, then général Decaen killed at Borny (August 12 to 14) and finally commanded by Marshal Le Bœuf.
 The 4th Army Corps, formed at Thionville on July 23 from the garrisons of the north and north-east, commanded by général de Ladmirault.
 The 5th Army Corps, formed with the Army of Lyon, commanded by general de Failly. This Army Corps assembled in the regions of Bitche and Haguenau.
 The 6th Army Corps of Marshal François Certain de Canrobert consisted of troops from Paris, Châlons, and Soissons and assembled at the camp de Châlons.
 The 7th Army Corps had difficulty assembling due to its units being widely dispersed. Troops of the Army Corps hailed from the south-east, Clermont-Ferrand, Perpignan, Civitavecchia and had to make their way to Colmar and Belfort. This Army Corps was commanded by général Douay.
 The general Cavalry Reserve was supposed to be formed initially of 3 divisions with 2 brigades each. However, only 2 divisions were available as the 1st Division was employed to reinforce the Army of Châlons as the cavalry of the 6th Corps.
 The general Artillery Reserve, commanded by général Canu, formed at Nancy and made its way to Metz.
 The general Engineer Reserve was commanded by colonel Rémond.

Composition and order of battle 
On August 1, 1870, the Army of the Rhine was constituted of seven Army Corps and of artillery and reserve cavalry. Lieutenant-colonel Rousset tendered an estimative decomposition by grand units:

Commandement and état-major

 Commander-in-Chief : Napoléon III
 Major General : Maréchal Le Bœuf
 Aides-major generals :
 général Lebrun
 général Jarras
 Artillery Commander : général Soleille
 Engineer Commander : général Coffinières de Nordeck
 Intendant of the Army : général Wolff
 Medical Chief of the Army : baron Larrey

The Imperial Guard 

 1st Infantry Division (voltigeurs)
The 1st Infantry Division of the Imperial Guard  was commanded by général Deligny
 1st Brigade of général Brincourt
 Imperial Guard Chasseur Battalion (commandant Dufaure du Bessol)
 Imperial Guard 1st Voltigeurs Regiment (colonel Dumont)
 Imperial Guard 2nd Voltigeurs Regiment (colonel Peychaud)
 2nd Brigade of général Garnier
 Imperial Guard 3rd Voltigeurs Regiment (colonel Lian)
 Imperial Guard 4th Voltigeurs Regiment (colonel Ponsard)
 3 Artillery Batteries (2 batteries de 4 and 1 de mitrailleuses) and 1 Engineer Company

 2nd Infantry Division (Grenadiers)
The 2nd Infantry Division of the Imperial Guard was commanded by général Picard
 1st Brigade of général Jeanningros
 Imperial Guard Zouaves Regiment (colonel Giraud)
 Imperial Guard 1st Grenadier Regiment à Pied (colonel Théologue)
2nd Brigade of général Le Poittevin de La Croix-Vaubois
 Imperial Guard 2nd Grenadier Regiment à Pied (colonel Lecointe)
 Imperial Guard 3rd Grenadier Regiment à Pied (colonel Cousin)
 3 Artillery Batteries  (2 batteries de 4 and 1 de mitrailleuses) and 1 Engineer Company

 Cavalry Division
The Cavalry Division of the Imperial Guard was commanded by général Desvaux
 1st Brigade of général Halna du Frétay
 13e Régiment de Chasseurs à Cheval (colonel de Percin Northumberland)
 Chasseurs Regiment (colonel de Montarby)
 2nd Brigade of général de France
 Lancers Regiment (colonel de Latheulade)
 The Empress's Dragoon Guards (colonel Sautereau-Dupart)
 3rd Brigade of général du Preuil
 Cuirassiers Regiment (colonel Dupressoir)
 Carabiniers Regiment of the Imperial Guard (colonel Petit)
 2 Artillery Batteries de 4 horse mounted

 Reserve Artillery (colonel Clappier)
 4 Artillery Batteries de 4 horse mounted
 1 Train equipped Squadron

 Parc Artillery (colonel Elie Jean de Vassoigne)

 Total artillery
 24 Battalions, 24 Squadrons, 72 pieces out of which 12 mitrailleuses, 2 Engineer Companies, 1 Train Squadron

1st Army Corps 
thumb|180px|Marshal de Mac Mahon, commander of the 1st Army Corps.
The 1st Army Corps was commanded by Patrice de MacMahon, Duke of Magenta, with chef d'état-major général Colson. général Ducrot, former commander of the 1st Division, succeeded Marshal Mac Mahon who recently assumed command of the Army of Châlons. général Joly Frigola commanded the artillery.

 1st Infantry Division
The 1st Infantry Division of the 1st Army Corps was under the orders of général Ducrot
 1st Brigade of général Wolff
 18th Infantry Regiment (colonel Bréger)
 96th Infantry Regiment (colonel de Franchessin)
 13e Bataillon de Chasseurs à Pied (commandant de Bonneville)
 2nd Brigade of général Postis du Houlbec
 45th Line Infantry Regiment (colonel Bertrand)
 1st Zouaves Regiment (colonel Carteret-Trecourt)
 3 Artillery Batteries (2 batteries de 4 and 1 de mitrailleuses) and 1 Engineer Company

 2nd Infantry Division
The 2nd Infantry Division of the 1st Army Corps was under the orders of général Douay
 1st Brigade of général Pelletier de Montmarie
 50th Infantry Regiment (colonel Ardoin)
 74th Infantry Regiment (colonel Theuvez)
 16e Bataillon de Chasseurs à Pied (commandant Anne Louis François Armand d'Hugues)
 2nd Brigade of général Pellé
 78th Infantry Regiment (colonel Carrey de Bellemare )
 1st Algerian Tirailleurs Regiment (colonel de Morandy)
 1st Marching Regiment (colonel Lecomte, 3 Battalions)
 3 Artillery Batteries  (2 batteries de 4 and 1 de mitrailleuses) and 1 Engineer Company

 3rd Infantry Division
The 3rd Infantry Division of the 1st Army Corps was under the orders of général Raoult
 1st Brigade of général l'Hériller
 36th Infantry Regiment (colonel Krien)
 2nd Zouaves Regiment (colonel Détrie)
 8e Bataillon de Chasseurs à Pied (commandant Poyet)
 2nd Brigade of général Lefebvre
 48th Infantry Regiment (colonel Rogier)
 2nd Algerian Tirailleurs Regiment (colonel Suzzoni)
 3 Artillery Batteries (2 batteries de 4 and 1 de mitrailleuses) and 1 Engineer Company

 4th Infantry Division
The 4th Infantry Division of the 1st Army Corps was under the orders of général de Lartigue
 1st Brigade under the orders of général Fraboulet de Kerléadec
 56th Infantry Regiment (colonel Ména)
 3rd Zouaves Regiment (colonel Bocher)
 1er Bataillon de Chasseurs à Pied (commandant Bureau)
 2nd Brigade under the orders of général Lacretelle
 87th Infantry Regiment (colonel Blot)
 3e Régiment de Tirailleurs Algériens (colonel Gandil)
 3 Artillery Batteries (2 batteries de 4 and 1 de mitrailleuses) and 1 Engineer Company

 Cavalry Division
The Cavalry Division of the 1st Army Corps was commanded by général Duhesme
 1st Brigade of général de Septeuil
 3rd Hussards Regiment (colonel de Vieil)
 11e Régiment de Chasseurs à Cheval (colonel Dastugue)
 2nd Brigade of général de Nansouty
 2nd Lancers Regiment (colonel Poissonnier)
 6th Lancers Regiment (colonel Tripart)
 10th Dragoon Regiment (colonel Perrot)
 3rd Brigade of général Michel
 8th Cuirassiers Regiment (colonel Guiot de la Rochère)
 9th Cuirassiers Regiment (colonel Waternau)

 Reserve Artillery
Artillery Reserve was under the orders of colonel Vassart d'Andernay
 2 Artillery Batteries de 12
 2 Artillery Batteries de 4 mounted
 2 Artillery Batteries de 4 horse mounted
 Parc Artillery, Reserve and Parc Engineer

2nd Army Corps 

The 2nd Army Corps was commanded by général Frossard, with chef d'état-major général Saget.

 1st Infantry Division
The 1st Infantry Division of the 2nd Army Corps was under the orders of général Vergé
 1st Brigade of général Letellier-Valazé
 32nd Infantry Regiment (colonel Merle)
 55th Infantry Regiment (colonel de Waldner de Freundstein)
 3e Bataillon de Chasseurs à Pied (commandant Thoma)
2nd Brigade of général Jolivet
 76th Infantry Regiment (colonel Brice)
 77th Infantry Regiment (colonel Février)
 3 Artillery Batteies (2 batteries de 4 and 1 de mitrailleuses) and 1 Engineer Company

 2nd Infantry Division
The 2nd Infantry Division of the 2nd Army Corps was under the orders of général Bataille
 1st Brigade of général Pouget
 8th Infantry Regiment (colonel Haca)
 23rd Infantry Regiment (colonel Rolland)
 12e Bataillon de Chasseurs à Pied (commandant Jouanne-Beaulieu)
 2nd Brigade of général Fauvart-Bastoul
 66th Infantry Regiment (colonel Ameller)
 67th Infantry Regiment (colonel Mangin)
 3 Artillery Batteries (2 batteries de 4 and 1 de mitrailleuses) and 1 Engineer Company

 3rd Infantry Division
The 3rd Infantry Division of the 2nd Army Corps was under the orders of général Merle de Labrugière de Laveaucoupet
 1st Brigade of général Doëns
 2nd Infantry Regiment (colonel Saint-Hillier)
 63rd Infantry Regiment (colonel Zentz)
 10e Bataillon de Chasseurs à Pied (commandant Schenk)
 2nd Brigade of général Micheler
 24th Infantry Regiment (colonel d'Arguesse)
 40th Infantry Regiment (colonel Vittot)
 3 Artillery Batteries (2 batteries de 4 and 1 de mitrailleuses) and 1 Engineer Company

 Cavalry Division
The Cavalry Division of the 2nd Army Corps was commanded by général Marmier
 1st Brigade of général de Valabrègue
 4e Régiment de Chasseurs à Cheval (colonel du Ferron)
 5e Régiment de Chasseurs à Cheval (colonel de Séréville)
 2nd Brigade of général Bachelier
 7th Dragoon Regiment (colonel de Gressot)
 12th Dragoon Regiment (colonel d'Avocourt)

 Reserve Artillery
Artillery Reserve was under the orders of colonel Beaudoin
 2 Artillery Batteries de 12
 2 Artillery Batteries de 4 mounted
 2 Artillery Batteries de 4 horse mounted
 Parc Artillery, Reserve and Parc Engineer

3rd Army Corps 

The 3rd Army Corps was commanded by Marshal  Bazaine, with chef d'état-major général Manèque.

 1st Infantry Division
The 1st Infantry Division of the 3rd Army Corps was under the orders of général Montaudon
1st Brigade of général baron Aymard
 51st Infantry Regiment (colonel Delebecque)
 62nd Infantry Regiment (colonel Dauphin)
 18e Bataillon de Chasseurs à Pied (commandant Charles Rigault)
 2nd Brigade of général Clinchant
 81st Infantry Regiment (colonel Collavier d'Albici)
 95th Infantry Regiment (colonel Davout d'Auerstaedt)
 3 Artillery Batteries (2 batteries de 4 and 1 de mitrailleuses) and 1 Engineer Company

 2nd Infantry Division
The 2nd Infantry Division of the 3rd Army Corps was under the orders of général de Castagny
 1st Brigade of général baron de Nayral
 19th Infantry Regiment (colonel de Launay)
 41st Infantry Regiment (colonel Saussier)
 15e Bataillon de Chasseurs à Pied (commandant Henri Anne François Archibald Lafouge)
 2nd Brigade of général Duplessis
 69th Infantry Regiment (colonel Le Tourneur)
 90th Infantry Regiment (colonel Roussel de Courcy)
 3 Artillery Batteries (2 batteries de 4 and 1 de mitrailleuses) and 1 Engineer Company

 3rd Infantry Division
The 3rd Infantry Division of the 3rd Army Corps was under the orders of général Metman
 1st Brigade of général de Potier
 7th Infantry Regiment  (colonel Cotteret)
 29th Infantry Regiment  (colonel Lalanne)
 7e Bataillon de Chasseurs à Pied  (commandant Rigaud)
 2nd Brigade of général Arnaudeau
 59th Infantry Regiment  (colonel Duez)
 71st Infantry Regiment  (colonel d'Audebard de Ferussac)
 3 Artillery Batteries (2 batteries de 4 and 1 de mitrailleuses) and 1 Engineer Company

4th Infantry Division
The 4th Infantry Division of the 3rd Army Corps was under the orders of général Decaen then Aymard
 1st Brigade of général de Brauer
 44th Infantry Regiment (colonel Fournier)
 60th Infantry Regiment (colonel Boissie)
 11e Bataillon de Chasseurs à Pied (commandant de Paillot)
 2nd Brigade of général Sanglé-Ferrière
 80th Infantry Regiment (colonel Janin)
 35th Infantry Regiment (colonel Plauchut)
 3 Artillery Batteries (2 batteries de 4 and 1 de mitrailleuses) and 1 Engineer Company

 Cavalry Division
The Cavalry Division of the 3rd Army Corps was commanded by général comte de Clérembault
 1st Brigade of général de Bruchard
 2e Régiment de Chasseurs à Cheval (colonel Pelletier)
 3e Régiment de Chasseurs à Cheval (colonel Sanson de Sansal)
 10e Régiment de Chasseurs à Cheval (colonel Nérin)
 2nd Brigade of général Gayault de Maubranches
 2nd Dragoon Regiment (colonel du Paty de Clam)
 4e Régiment de Dragons (colonel Cornat)
 3rd Brigade of général Bégougne de Juniac
 5th Dragoon Regiment (colonel Euchène)
 8th Dragoon Regiment (colonel Boyer de Fonscolombe)

 Reserve Artillery
Artillery Reserve was under the orders of colonel de Lajaille
 2 Artillery Batteries de 12
 2 Artillery Batteries de 4 mounted
 2 Artillery Batteries de 4 horse mounted
 Parc Artillery, Reserve and Parc Engineer

4th Army Corps 

The 4th Army Corps was commanded by général de Ladmirault, with chef d'état-major général Osmont.

 1st Infantry Division
The 1st Infantry Division of the 4th Army Corps was under the orders of général Courtot de Cissey
 1st Brigade of général comte Brayer
 1st Infantry Regiment (colonel Frémont)
 6th Infantry Regiment (colonel Labarthe)
 20e Bataillon de Chasseurs à Pied (commandant Augustin Marcel Maurice de Labarrière)
 2nd Brigade of général de Golberg
 57th Infantry Regiment (colonel Giraud)
 73rd Infantry Regiment (colonel Supervielle)
 3 Artillery Batteries (2 batteries de 4 et 1 de mitrailleuses) and 1 Engineer Company

 2nd Infantry Division
The 2nd Infantry Division of the 4th Army Corps was under the orders of général Rose then Grenier
 1st Brigade of général Véron dit Bellecourt
 13th Infantry Regiment (colonel Lion)
 43rd Infantry Regiment (colonel de Viville)
 5e Bataillon de Chasseurs à Pied (commandant Carré)
 2nd Brigade of général Pradier
 64th Infantry Regiment (colonel Léger)
 98th Infantry Regiment (colonel Lechesne)
 3 batteries d'artillerie (2 batteries de 4 et 1 de mitrailleuses) and 1 Engineer Company

 3rd Infantry Division
The 3rd Infantry Division of the 4th Army Corps was under the orders of général Latrille comte de Lorencez
 1st Brigade of général comte de Pajol
 15th Infantry Regiment (colonel Fraboulet de Kerléadec)
 33rd Infantry Regiment (colonel Bounetou)
 2e Bataillon de Chasseurs à Pied (commandant Le Tanneur)
 2nd Brigade of général Berger
 54th Infantry Regiment (colonel Caillot)
 65th Infantry Regiment (colonel Sée)
 3 Artillery Batteries (2 batteries de 4 et 1 de mitrailleuses) and 1 Engineer Company

 Cavalry Division
The Cavalry Division of the 4th Army Corps was commanded by général Legrand
 1st Brigade of général de Montaigu
 2nd Hussard Regiment (colonel Carrelet)
 7th Hussard Regiment (colonel Chaussée)
 2nd Brigade of général baron de Gondrecourt
 3rd Dragoon Regiment (colonel Bilhau)
 11th Dragoon Regiment (colonel Huyn de Verneville)

 Reserve Artillery
Artillery Reserve was under the orders of colonel Soleille
 2 Artillery Batteries de 12
 2 Artillery Batteries de 4 mounted
 2 Artillery Batteries de 4 horse mounted
 Parc Artillery, Reserve and Parc Engineer

5th Army Corps 

The 5th Army Corps was commanded by général de Failly, with chef d'état-major général Besson.

 1st Infantry Division
The 1st Infantry Division of the 5th Army Corps was under the orders of général Goze.
 1st Brigade of général Grenier then Saurin
 11th Infantry Regiment (colonel de Béhagle)
 46th Infantry Regiment (colonel Pichon)
 4e Bataillon de Chasseurs à Pied (commandant Foncegrives)
 2nd Brigade of général baron Nicolas
 61st Infantry Regiment (colonel du Moulin)
 86th Infantry Regiment (colonel Auguste Florimond dit Alexis Berthe)
 3 Artillery Batteries (2 batteries de 4 and 1 de mitrailleuses) and 1 Engineer Company

 2nd Infantry Division
The 2nd Infantry Division of the 5th Army Corps was under the orders of général de l'Abadie d'Aydren.
 1st Brigade of général Lapasset
 84th Infantry Regiment (colonel Benoit)
 97th Infantry Regiment (colonel Copmartin)
 14e Bataillon de Chasseurs à Pied (commandant Planck)
 2nd Brigade of général de Maussion
 49th Infantry Regiment (colonel Kampf)
 88th Infantry Regiment (colonel Courty)
 3 Artillery Batteries (2 batteries de 4 and 1 de mitrailleuses) and 1 Engineer Company

 3rd Infantry Division
The 3rd Infantry Division of the 5th Army Corps was under the orders of général Guyot de Lespart
 1st Brigade of général Abattucci
 17th Infantry Regiment (colonel Weissemberger)
 27th Infantry Regiment (colonel de Barolet)
 19e Bataillon de Chasseurs à Pied (commandant Léon Michel Marie Louis de Marqué)
 2nd Brigade of général de Fontanges de Couzan
 30th Infantry Regiment (colonel Wirbel)
 68th Infantry Regiment (colonel Paturel)
 3 Artillery Batteries (2 batteries de 4 and 1 de mitrailleuses) and 1 Engineer Company

 Cavalry Division
The Cavalry Division of the 5th Army Corps was commanded by général Brahaut
 1st Brigade of général de Bernis
 5th Hussards Regiment (colonel Flogny)
 12e Régiment de Chasseurs à Cheval (colonel de Tucé)
 2nd Brigade of général de la Mortière
 3rd Lancers Regiment (colonel Thorel)
 5th Lancers Regiment (colonel de Boério)

 Reserve Artillery
Colonel de Salignac-Fénelon
 2 Artillery Batteries de 12
 2 Artillery Batteries de 4 mounted
 2 Artillery Batteries de 4 horse mounted
 Parc Artillery, Reserve and Parc Engineer

6th Army Corps 

 1st Infantry Division
The 1st Infantry Division of the 6th Army Corps was under the orders of général Tixier
 1st Brigade of général Péchot
 4th Infantry Regiment (colonel Vincendon)
 10th Infantry Regiment (colonel Ardan du Picq)
 9e Bataillon de Chasseurs à Pied (commandant Mathelin)
 2nd Brigade of général Leroy de Dais
 12th Infantry Regiment (colonel Lebrun)
 100th Infantry Regiment (colonel Grémion)
 3 Artillery Batteries (2 batteries de 4 and 1 de mitrailleuses) and 1 Engineer Company

 2nd Infantry Division
The 2nd Infantry Division of the 6th Army Corps was under the orders of général Bisson
 1st Brigade of général Noel puis Archinard
 9e Régiment d'Infanterie de Ligne (colonel Roux)
 14th Infantry Regiment (colonel Louvent)
 2nd Brigade of général Maurice
 20th Infantry Regiment (colonel de la Guigneraye)
 31st Infantry Regiment (colonel Sautereau)
 3 Artillery Batteries (2 batteries de 4 et 1 de mitrailleuses) and 1 Engineer Company

 3rd Infantry Division
The 3rd Infantry Division of the 6th Army Corps was under the orders of général Lafont de Villiers
 1st Brigade of général Béquet de Sonnay
 75th Infantry Regiment (colonel Amadieu)
 91st Infantry Regiment (colonel Daguerre)
 2nd Brigade of général Colin
 93rd Infantry Regiment (colonel Ganzin)
 94th Infantry Regiment (colonel de Geslin)
 3 Artillery Batteries batteries de 4 et 1 Engineer Company

4th Infantry Division
The 4th Infantry Division of the 6th Army Corps was under the orders of général Levassor-Sorval
 1st Brigade of général de Marguenat then Gibon
 25th Infantry Regiment (colonel Gibon)
 26th Infantry Regiment (colonel Hanrion)
 2nd Brigade of général comte de Chanaleilles
 28th Infantry Regiment (colonel Lamothe)
 70th Infantry Regiment (colonel Henrion Bertier)
 3 Artillery Batteries de 4 and 1 Engineer Company

 Cavalry Division
The Cavalry Division of the 6th Army Corps was commanded by général de Salignac-Fénelon
 1st Brigade of général Tilliard
 1er Régiment de Hussards (colonel de Bauffremont)
 6e Régiment de Chasseurs à Cheval (colonel Bonvoust)
 2nd Brigade of général de Savaresse
 1st Lancers Regiment (colonel Oudinot de Reggio)
 7th Lancers Regiment (colonel Périer)
 3rd Brigade of général Yvelin de Béville
 5th Cuirassiers Regiment (colonel Dubessey de Contenson)
 6th Cuirassiers Regiment (colonel Martin)

 Cavalry Division
The Cavalry Division attached to the 6th Army Corps since August 18 in replacement of the division of Salignac-Fénelon, was commanded by général du Barail
 1st Brigade of  général de Lajaille
 2nd African Chasseurs Regiment (colonel de la Martinière)
 2nd Chasseurs Regiment of France (colonel Pelletier)
 2nd Brigade of  général de Bruchard
 3e Régiment de Chasseurs à Cheval (colonel de Sansal)
 10e Régiment de Chasseurs à Cheval (colonel Nérin)

 Reserve Artillery
 Artillery reserve under the orders of général Bertrand
 2 Artillery Batteries de 12
 4 Artillery Batteries de 4 montées
 2 Artillery Batteries de 4 horse mounted
 Parc d'artillerie, réserve et parc du génie

7th Army Corps 

The 7th Army Corps was commanded by général Douay, with chef d'état-major général Renson.

 1st Infantry Division
The 1st Infantry Division of the 7th Army Corps was under the orders of général Conseil-Dumesnil.
 1st Brigade of général Nicolaï
 3rd Infantry Regiment (colonel Champion)
 21st Infantry Regiment (colonel Morand)
 17e Bataillon de Chasseurs à Pied (commandant Jules Florimond Germain Merchier)
 2nd Brigade of général Maire
 47th Infantry Regiment (colonel de Gramont)
 99th Infantry Regiment (colonel Chagrin de Saint-Hilaire)
 3 Artillery Batteries (two batteries de 4 and 1 de mitrailleuse) and 1 Engineer Company

 2nd Infantry Division
The 2nd Infantry Division of the 7th Army Corps was under the orders of général Liébert.
 1st Brigade of général Guiomar
 5th Infantry Regiment (colonel Boyer)
 37th Infantry Regiment (colonel de Formy de la Blanchetée)
 6e Bataillon de Chasseurs à Pied (commandant de Beaufort)
 2nd Brigade of général de la Bastide
 53 Infantry Regiment (colonel Japy)
 89th Infantry Regiment (colonel Munier)
 3 Artillery Batteries (two batteries de 4 and 1 de mitrailleuse) and 1 Engineer Company

 3rd Infantry Division
The 3rd Infantry Division of the 7th Army Corps was under the orders of général Dumont.
 1st Brigade of général Bordas
 52nd Infantry Regiment (colonel Aveline)
 79th Infantry Regiment (colonel Bressolles)
 2nd Brigade of général Bittard des Portes
 82nd Infantry Regiment (colonel Guys)
 83rd Infantry Regiment (colonel Séatelli)
 3 Artillery Batteries (two batteries de 4 and 1 de mitrailleuse) and 1 Engineer Company

 Cavalry Division

The Cavalry Division of the 7th Army Corps was commanded by général baron Ameil.
 1st Brigade of général Cambriel
 4e Régiment de Hussards (colonel de Lavigerie)
 4th Lancers Regiment (colonel Féline)
 8th Lancers Regiment (colonel de Dampierre)
 2nd Brigade of général Jolif-Ducoulombier
 6th Hussards Regiment (colonel Guillon)
 6e Régiment de Dragons (colonel Tillion)

 Reserve Artillery
Colonel Aubac
 2 Artillery Batteries de 12,
 2 Artillery Batteries de 4 mounted,
 2 Artillery Batteries de 4 horse mounted.
 Parc Artillery, Reserves and Parc Engineer.

Reserve Cavalry 
 1st Cavalry Division 

The 1st Reserve Cavalry Division was commanded by général du Barail.

 1st Brigade of général Margueritte.
 1st African Chasseurs Regiment (colonel Clicquot)
 3rd African Chasseurs Regiment (colonel de Galliffet)
 2nd Brigade of général de Lajaille.
 2nd African Chasseurs Regiment (colonel de la Martinière)
 4th African Chasseurs Regiment (colonel de Quélen)
 2 Artillery Batteries horse mounted

The 2nd Reserve Cavalry Division was commanded by général de Bonnemain.

 2nd Cavalry Division
 1st Brigade of général Girard.
 1st Cuirassiers Regiment (colonel Leforestier de Vendeuvre)
 4th Cuirassiers Regiment (colonel Billet)
 2nd Brigade of général de Brauer.
 2nd Cuirassiers Regiment (colonel Rossetti)
 3rd Cuirassiers Regiment (colonel Lafutsun de Lacarre)
 2 Artillery Batteries horse mounted

 3rd Cavalry Division

The 3rd Reserve Cavalry Division was commanded by général de Forton.

 1st Brigade of général Prince Murat.
 1st Dragoon Regiment (colonel Forceville)
 9th Dragoon Regiment (colonel Reboul)
 2nd Brigade of général de Gramont, duc de Lesparre.
 7th Cuirassiers Regiment (colonel Nitot)
 10th Cuirassiers Regiment (colonel Juncker)
 2 Artillery Batteries horse mounted

Reserve Artillery and Engineer 
 General Reserve Artillery
Commanded by général Canu.
 1st Division of colonel Salvador (8 Artillery Batteries de 12)
 1st Division of colonel Toussaint (8 Artillery Batteries horse mounted)

 Grand parc de campagne
Commanded by général de Mitrecé.

 General Reserve of Engineer
Commanded by colonel Rémond.
 2 Sapeurs Companies
 1 Mining Company
 1 Detachment of Sapeurs-Conducteurs

 Grand parc du Génie

Chronology of operations 
 Battle of Sarrebuck (1870).
 Order of Battle during the Battle of Sarrebruck.
 Battle of Wissembourg (1870).
 Order of Battle during the Battle of Wissembourg (1870).
 Battle of Forbach-Spicheren.
 Order of Battle during the Battle of Forbach-Spicheren.
 Battle of Frœschwiller-Wœrth (1870).
 Order of Battle during the Battle Frœschwiller-Wœrth.
 Bitche during the Siege of 1870–1871.
 Battle of Borny–Colombey.
 Battle of Mars-la-Tour.
 Siege of Toul.
 Battle of Saint-Privat.
 Siege of Metz (1870).
 Siege of Strasbourg.
 Battle of Noisseville.

References

Sources and bibliography 
 Lieutenant-colonel Rousset, Histoire générale de la guerre franco allemande - 1870–1871, éditions Montgredien et Cie, 1900.
 Paul et Victor Margueritte, Histoire de la guerre de 1870–71, Éditions G. Chamerot, 1903.
 Général Niox, La guerre de 1870 - Simple récit, Librairie Ch. Delagrave, 1898.
 Annuaire militaire de l'empire français 1870
 Ferdinand Lecomte : Relation historique et critique de la guerre franco-allemande en 1870–1871
Annuaire militaire de 1870 (pour les prénoms)

Military units and formations of the Franco-Prussian War
Field armies of France